The 1986 Ms. Olympia contest was an IFBB professional bodybuilding competition was held on November 19, 1986, at the Felt Forum in Madison Square Garden in New York City, New York. It was the 7th Ms. Olympia competition held.

Results

See also
 1986 Mr. Olympia

References

 1986 Ms. Olympia (Historic DVD)
 1986 Ms Olympia Results

External links
 Competitor History of the Ms. Olympia

Ms Olympia, 1986
Ms. Olympia
Ms. Olympia
History of female bodybuilding